Five ships of the Royal Navy have been named HMS Barfleur after the Battle of Barfleur:
  was a 90-gun second-rate ship of the line launched in 1697, rebuilt in 1716 with 80 guns, and hulked in 1764. She was broken up in 1783. 
  was a 90-gun second-rate ship of the line launched in 1768, and later increased to 98 guns. She was broken up in 1819. 
She was renamed HMS Barfleur in 1819 and was broken up in 1825.
  was a  launched in 1892 and broken up in 1910.
  was a  launched in 1943 and broken up in 1966.

Battle honours
Ships named Barfleur have earned the following battle honours:

 Vigo, 1702
 Velez Malaga, 1704
 Passero, 1718
 St Kitts, 1782
 The Saints, 1782
 First of June, 1794
 Groix Island, 1795
 St Vincent, 1797
 China, 1900

See also 
 Barfleur (disambiguation)

References
 

Royal Navy ship names